The first Kok cabinet, also called the first Purple cabinet was the executive branch of the Dutch government from 22 August 1994 until 3 August 1998. The cabinet was formed by the social-democratic Labour Party (PvdA), the conservative-liberal People's Party for Freedom and Democracy (VVD), and the social-liberal Democrats 66 after the election of 1994. The cabinet was a centrist grand coalition and had a substantial majority in the House of Representatives with Labour Leader Wim Kok serving as Prime Minister. Prominent Liberal politician Hans Dijkstal served as Deputy Prime Minister and Minister of the Interior, while Progressive-Liberal Leader Hans van Mierlo served as Deputy Prime Minister and Minister of Foreign Affairs.

The cabinet served during the economic expansion of the 1990s. Domestically, it was able to implement several major social reforms such as legalizing euthanasia and had to deal with the fallout of the El Al Flight 1862 crash. Internationally, the signing of the Treaty of Amsterdam took place, but it also had to deal with several crises such as the Bosnian War. The cabinet suffered no major internal conflicts, completing its entire term, and was succeeded by a continuation of the coalition in the second Kok cabinet following the election of 1998.

Formation
After the election on 3 May 1994 the Labour Party (PvdA) of Wim Kok was the winner of the election despite losing 12 seats and now had a total of 37 seats. The Christian Democratic Appeal of incumbent Prime Minister Ruud Lubbers who had announced his retirement from national politics earlier was succeeded as Leader of the Christian Democratic Appeal by the Parliamentary leader of the Christian Democratic Appeal in the House of Representatives Elco Brinkman, a former Minister of Welfare, Health and Culture on 29 January 1994, under the new leadership they lost 20 seats and now had 34 seats. The Democrats 66 of Hans van Mierlo was the biggest winner gaining 12 new seats and now had a total of 24 seats. The People's Party for Freedom and Democracy under Frits Bolkestein where the other big winner gaining 9 new seats had a total of 31 seats in the House of Representatives.

On 6 May 1994 Queen Beatrix appointed President of the Senate Herman Tjeenk Willink (PvdA) as Informateur to start the cabinet formation process. After a first round of talks the Labour Party, the People's Party for Freedom and Democracy and the Democrats 66 agreed to start negotiation talks. The first round of negotiations were troubled by objections from the Leader of the People's Party for Freedom and Democracy Frits Bolkenstein, in the end an agreement was reached to form a coalition. On 14 May 1994 Queen Beatrix appointed President of the Association of Netherlands Municipalities Klaas de Vries (PvdA), a former Member of the House of Representatives and Gijs van Aardenne (VVD), a former Deputy Prime Minister and Minister of Economic Affairs and Senator Jan Vis (D66), a professor of Constitutional law at the University of Groningen as Informateurs. On 3 June 1994 party leaders Wim Kok (PvdA), Frits Bolkenstein (VVD) and Hans van Mierlo (D66) reached an agreement to begin the cabinet formation. The final cabinet formation negotiations were also troubled by new objections from Frits Bolkenstein about a stronger integration policy and on 26 June 1994 negotiations between the parties failed to form a cabinet.

On 27 June 1994 Queen Beatrix reappointed Herman Tjeenk Willink as Informateur to look at the possibility of the Christian Democratic Appeal joining the Labour Party and the Democrats 66 in a coalition but objections from Democrats 66 halted that. On 6 July 1994 Queen Beatrix appointed Wim Kok as Informateur to write an open coalition proposal with the possibility of other parties to join the agreement. On 29 July 1994 the Labour Party, the People's Party for Freedom and Democracy and the Democrats 66 finally agreed to form a cabinet and Queen Beatrix appointed Wim Kok as Formateur that same day and tasked him with forming a new cabinet. On 22 August 1994 the cabinet formation was completed and the First Kok cabinet was installed with Wim Kok as Prime Minister and with Hans Dijkstal and Hans van Mierlo as Deputy Prime Ministers.

On 16 August 1994 shortly before the cabinet formation was completed Elco Brinkman who had only been the Leader of the Christian Democratic Appeal since 29 January 1994 stepped down following the disappointing election results and his inability to join the new cabinet, he was succeeded by Member of the House of Representatives Enneüs Heerma, the former State Secretary for Housing, Spatial Planning and the Environment.

Term
The main aim of the cabinet under the lead of Wim Kok was to create employment. Gross domestic product (GDP) growth had been erratic in recent years. The aim of the cabinet was to increase the influence of markets in the economy, with policies of tax reduction, economizing and trying to keep people out of the social care by supporting employment. Large infrastructural projects were started. Another aim was to make an end to the enormous debt of the Dutch government.

The Treaty of Amsterdam was signed during this cabinet. The Srebrenica massacre occurred under the responsibility of this government, which led later to the fall of the Second Kok cabinet.

The cabinet started processes of liberalization which were completed by the same coalition in the following cabinet: the legalization of prostitution in 2000, same-sex marriage in 2001 and Euthanasia in 2002.

This cabinet was the last to serve a full term until the Second Rutte cabinet from 2012 to 2017. Five of the following cabinets resigned and one was a temporary caretaker cabinet.

Changes
On 28 June 1996, State Secretary for Social Affairs and Employment Robin Linschoten (VVD) resigned after a majority of the House of Representatives indicated that they had lost confidence in his ability to remain in office after a critical parliamentary inquiry into his handling of several social security issues was released. On 2 July 1996, Amsterdam alderman Frank de Grave (VVD), a former Member of the House of Representatives was appointed as his successor.

Cabinet members

Trivia
 Four cabinet members would later be granted the honorary title of Minister of State: Wim Kok (2002), Hans van Mierlo (1998), Winnie Sorgdrager (2018) and Els Borst (2012).
 Four cabinet members had previous experience as scholars and professors: Gerrit Zalm (Political Economics), Joris Voorhoeve (International Relations), Els Borst (Medical Ethics) and Jo Ritzen (Public Economics).
 Eight cabinet members (later) served as Party Leaders: Wim Kok (1986–2001) and Ad Melkert (2001–2002) of the Labour Party, Hans Dijkstal (1998–2002), Gerrit Zalm (2002–2004), Joris Voorhoeve (1986–1990) and Jozias van Aartsen (2004–2006) of the People's Party for Freedom and Democracy, Hans van Mierlo (1966–1973, 1986–1998) and Els Borst (1998) of the Democrats 66.

References

External links
Official

  Kabinet-Kok I Rijksoverheid
  Kabinet-Kok I Parlement & Politiek

1994 establishments in the Netherlands
1998 disestablishments in the Netherlands
Cabinets established in 1994
Cabinets disestablished in 1998
Cabinets of the Netherlands
Grand coalition governments